Oscar Smith (born April 5, 1963)  is a former professional American football running back in the National Football League for the Detroit Lions.

He played college football at Nicholls State University and was drafted in the fifth round of the 1985 NFL Draft. He played for the Lions during the 1986 season.

References

External links
Nicholls State Colonels bio

Living people
American football linebackers
Detroit Lions players
Nicholls Colonels football players
1963 births
Thomas Jefferson High School (Tampa, Florida) alumni